Kama Sutra Records was started in 1964 by Arthur "Artie" Ripp, Hy Mizrahi and Phil Steinberg as Kama Sutra Productions, a production house. The "Kama Sutra" is an ancient Sanskrit text.

In 1965, the company was joined by Art Kass and the record label itself was started. A distribution deal with MGM Records was later signed, which lasted from 1965 until 1969. From 1969 onward, distribution was then handled by co-owned Buddah Records.

The record company ceased in mid-1976 but restarted in 1981 as Sutra Records. Under this moniker, Kass marketed and distributed Fever Records, Blue Dog Records, Baila Records, Becket Records, and signed and recorded the Cover Girls, the Fat Boys, Victor Willis, and many more before the company filed for Chapter 7 bankruptcy in 1993. The 1965–1976 Kama Sutra catalogue is now owned by Sony Music Entertainment and managed by Legacy Recordings. The 1981–1993 Sutra catalogue, with the exception of the Fat Boys, is controlled by Unidisc Music.

Kama Sutra artists

Terry Black & Laurel Ward
Brewer & Shipley
Gordon Brisker
Charlie Daniels Band
Dust
Exuma
Fat Boys
The Fifth Dimension 
Flamin' Groovies
Gene Vincent
Gunhill Road
Hackamore Brick
The Innocence
The Jaggerz
The Lovin' Spoonful
Menudo
NRBQ
Ocean
The Pussycats
Revival 
Royal Cash
Scratch
The Sermon
Sha Na Na
The Shangri-las
Sopwith Camel
Stories
The Trade Winds
Victor Willis

See also
 Lists of record labels

References

External links
The Kama Sutra / Buddah Records Story

Defunct record labels of the United States
American record labels
Record labels established in 1964
Record labels disestablished in 1976
Record labels established in 1981
Record labels disestablished in 1993
Re-established companies
Pop record labels
Hip hop record labels
Electronic dance music record labels
Companies that have filed for Chapter 7 bankruptcy